Isabella, Countess of Gloucester (1173/1174 – 14 October 1217), was an English noblewoman who was married to King John prior to his accession.

Lineage
Isabella was the daughter of William Fitz Robert, 2nd Earl of Gloucester, and his wife Hawise. Her paternal grandfather, Robert, 1st Earl of Gloucester, was the illegitimate son of King Henry I. Her father died in 1183, at which time she became Countess of Gloucester suo jure.

Royal marriage and annulment
On 28 September 1176, King Henry II betrothed Isabella to his youngest son, John Lackland. John and Isabella were half-second cousins as great-grandchildren of Henry I, and thus within the prohibited degrees of consanguinity. But in the marriage agreement, the King agreed to find the best husband possible for Isabella should the Pope refuse to grant a dispensation for the marriage. Henry also declared Isabella the sole heir to Gloucester, disinheriting her two sisters.

On 29 August 1189, John and Isabella were married at Marlborough Castle in Wiltshire, and John assumed the Earldom of Gloucester in her right. Baldwin, Archbishop of Canterbury, declared the marriage null by reason of consanguinity and placed their lands under interdict. The interdict was lifted by Pope Clement III. The Pope granted a dispensation to marry but forbade the couple from having sexual relations.

Shortly after John acceded to the throne in 1199, and before the end of August, he obtained an annulment of the marriage. The annulment was granted on the grounds of consanguinity, by the bishops of Lisieux, Bayeux, and Avranches, sitting in Normandy. John, however, kept her lands, and Isabella did not contest the annulment.

Earldom of Gloucester
After the annulment, John granted the title of Earl of Gloucester to Isabella's nephew Amaury, count of Évreux. This compensated Amaury for the loss of his French title, which was surrendered in the Treaty of Le Goulet. Upon his death without issue in 1213, Isabella once again became Countess of Gloucester.

Later marriages
Isabel later married Geoffrey FitzGeoffrey de Mandeville, 2nd Earl of Essex, on 20 January 1214. He died in 1216. A year after Essex's demise, she married Hubert de Burgh (later Earl of Kent), later the justiciar of England, in September 1217.

Death and burial
Isabella died just a month after her third marriage, probably at Keynsham Abbey in Somerset, which was founded by her father, and was interred in Canterbury Cathedral.

Fictional portrayals
A very fanciful depiction of her as a witch appears in The Devil and King John, a historical novel by Philip Lindsay, where she is called Hadwisa. In his introduction, Lindsay acknowledged that he had no evidence that she was a witch, but for the purposes of his plot, he needed to provide a link between John and witchcraft.
She appears as the character Hadwisa in Robin of Sherwood, played by Patricia Hodge.
She appears as character Avice in The Adventures of Robin Hood episode "Isabella" played by Helen Cherry.
Jessica Raine plays her in the 2010 film Robin Hood.
Featured briefly as Avisa in Virginia Henley's The Falcon and the Flower.
Appears as Isobel in Roberta Gellis' historical romance novel Roselynde.
Appears in Maureen Peters' historical novel Lackland's Bride.
Appears as Avisa in Sharon Kay Penman's historical novel Here Be Dragons.
Appears as Avisa in Erica Laine's historical novel Isabella of Angouleme: the Tangled Queen Part One

References

|-

|-

1170s births
1217 deaths
12th-century English nobility
13th-century English nobility
12th-century English women
13th-century English women
Isabella
Isabella
Hereditary women peers
Isabella, Countess of Gloucester
John, King of England
Lords of Glamorgan
Isabella
Repudiated queens
Year of birth uncertain